I Am Cold is the second studio album by post-punk band Rip Rig + Panic, released on 18 June 1982 by Virgin Records. Like the group's first album God, it was released as two 12" 45 rpm discs; the group's subsequent album Attitude would be a conventional 12" 33rpm release. In 2013, the album was reissued by Cherry Red Records on CD with an additional tracks taken from singles.

Track listing

Accolades

Personnel 
Adapted from the I Am Cold liner notes.

Rip Rig + Panic
 Neneh Cherry – vocals (A2, B1, C3, D1)
 Sean Oliver – bass guitar
 Gareth Sager – piano (A4, B1, B3, C1, D3), guitar (A3, B2, D1), clarinet (B2, B4, C3), alto saxophone (A3, C2), string arrangement (B1, B4), bass clarinet (A3), vocals (C3)
 Bruce Smith – drums, percussion
 Mark Springer – piano (A1-A3, B2, B4, C2, C3, D1, D2), vocals (A1, A2, B1, B2, C1, C2, D2), tenor saxophone (A3, B1), soprano saxophone (B3, C1, D3), bass clarinet (B3), clavinet (C2)
Additional musicians
 Don Cherry – trumpet (A2, B2, B3, C1, C3, D4), melodica (A2, C1), vocals (B2, C3)
 David Defries – trumpet (B1, C2, D1), horn arrangement (B3)
 Debbie Holmes – cello (B1)
 Woo Honeymoon – violin (B1, B4)
 Giles Leaman – additional drums and percussion
 Jez Parfitt – baritone saxophone (D1)
 Steve Noble – additional drums and percussion

Additional musicians (cont.)
 Andrea Oliver – backing vocals (B1, D1)
 Sarah Sarahandi – viola (A1, B1, B4)
 Dave "Flash" Wright – tenor saxophone (B1, B3, C1, C2), flute (B3)
Production and additional personnel
 Anna Arnoe – photography
 David Corrio – photography
 Howard Gray – engineering
 Dave Hunt – engineering
 Lester Johnston – engineering
 Adam Kidron – engineering
 Jill Mumford – design
 Sally Orsono – photography
 Pablo Picasso – cover art
 Sid Rudland – engineering
 Nick Watson – remastering

Release history

References

External links 
 

1982 albums
Rip Rig + Panic albums
Virgin Records albums
Cherry Red Records albums